Randalstown railway station was on the Belfast and Ballymena Railway which ran from Cookstown Junction to Cookstown in Northern Ireland.

History

The station was opened by the Belfast and Ballymena Railway on 11 April 1848. The station buildings were designed by the architect Charles Lanyon.

The station was moved and re-opened on 10 November 1856 when the line was extended to Cookstown.

The station closed to passengers on 28 August 1950.

References 

Disused railway stations in County Antrim
Railway stations opened in 1848
Railway stations closed in 1950

Railway stations in Northern Ireland opened in 1848